School Street School may refer to the following places:

School Street School (Haverhill, Massachusetts)
School Street School (Taunton, Massachusetts)